Woman's clubs or women's clubs are examples of the woman's club movement.  Many local clubs and national or regional federations were influential in history.  The importance of some local clubs is demonstrated by their women's club buildings being listed on historic registries.

In the United States, the General Federation of Women's Clubs (GFWC) became the primary umbrella organization of women's clubs in the United States.  "For the later part of the nineteenth century and
much of the twentieth century, the women's clubs were an essential vehicle for women's activity outside of the home."  In New Mexico alone, a state federation grew to include 59 clubs.

In Australia, the Country Women's Association had numerous clubs.

Most historical women's clubs served social and charitable purposes, most of which may seem relatively uncontroversial today.  These purposes have included voluntary civic service purposes such as:
opening lending libraries and seeking funding to create permanent public libraries
pursuing historic preservation
advocating for women's suffrage, other rights for women
campaigning against lynching and Jim Crow laws
serving as professional women's clubs, comparable to historic men's clubs of London
serving as athletic clubs or otherwise supporting sports, physical activity
addressing sanitation and health issues
hosting social activities, including card games
hosting lectures and otherwise engaging in education
addressing employment and labor conditions
Some women's groups with a more activist political orientation which used "club" in their name, such as perhaps the Alpha Suffrage Club which fought for black female suffrage in Chicago, are included here, too.

Notable examples

International
 Young Women's Christian Association (YWCA), founded as an international organization in 1894, had roots from 1855.  In 120 countries.
 Woman's Christian Temperance Union, organized in Ohio in 1873, has affiliates in Australia, Canada, Germany, Finland, India, Japan, New Zealand, Norway, South Korea, United Kingdom, and the United States
International Association of Lyceum Clubs, founded in 1904 in London, England, asserted to have clubs in 17 countries.  Was formed as a place for women involved with literature, journalism, art, science and medicine to meet in an atmosphere that was similar to the men's professional clubs of that era.
P.E.O. Sisterhood, founded as a sorority in Iowa in 1869, went national in 1883.  A charitable organization.
List of Cosmopolitan Clubs.  England, Australia, New Zealand, Canada, China, India, U.S. (Are/were these all women's clubs?  The ones in Philadelphia and NYC were, and have articles, and are separate items below.)
Women's International Motorcycle Association, founded in 1950, in 25 countries, purports to be the largest women's motorcycle organization
Women for Sobriety, founded in 1976, for women only, an alternative to the Twelve Steps program of Alcoholics Anonymous.
Women in the Wind (motorcycle club), founded in 1979, has had 100 chapters in the United States, Canada, Great Britain and Portugal, also purports to be the largest women's motorcycle organization

Australia
Wonglepong QCWA Hall
Adelaide Women's Club
Brisbane Women's Club
Karrakatta Club
Lyceum Club (Australia)
Queen Adelaide Club

Azerbaijan
Ali Bayramov Club, Baku, founded in 1920 as a literacy and sewing circle, it campaigned for women's unveiling and literacy.

Cuba
Lyceum and Lawn Tennis Club (1929–39), Havana.  A women's cultural, social, and physical fitness organization; it established Cuba's first free public library, first children's library, and first course of instruction for librarians.

England
University Women's Club, Mayfair, London
Pioneer Club (women's club), London
Grosvenor Crescent Club, London, which split off from the Pioneer Club
Ladies Dining Society (1890-World War I), Cambridge, a private women's dining and discussion club at Cambridge University.  Primarily wives of male professors and college fellows. Members campaigned for Cambridge to grant degrees to women, and most were strong supporters of female suffrage.
Ladies' Alpine Club (1907-1975), London, the first mountaineering club for women.

Greece
Lyceum Club of Greek Women, founded in Athens in 1911, has 51 branches including 16 outside of Greece.  Its purpose is to preserve and promote Greek cultural heritage and it opened, in 1988, the Museum of the History of the Greek Costume.

United States
In the United States a number of clubs were established, and corresponding buildings were built, in the early 1900s as part of a scheme by publisher Edward Gardner Lewis to promote sales of Woman's Magazine, but many more were independent organizations.

Numerous women's club buildings have been evaluated for listing on the U.S. National Register of Historic Places (NRHP) individually or as part of wider collections.  Historic preservation studies have been conducted for women's clubhouses in Florida, in Illinois, in New Jersey, in New Mexico, and in Olympia, Washington

Women's clubs in the United States were indexed by the GFWC, and also by Helen M. Winslow who published an annual "register and directory" of the GFWC ones and some more, which was in its 24th annual edition in 1922.  The GWFC did not admit clubs for African-American women, and Winslow's directory seems to omit them too.

Various clubs for black women / African American women are included by state below, but see also
:Category:National Association of Colored Women's Clubs which includes a number of them.

Multiple locations nationwide, primarily in United States
The Links, Incorporated, founded in 1946; the largest and most influential organization for Black women
Ladies of the Grand Army of the Republic (Ladies of the G.A.R.), founded 1881 as "Loyal Ladies League", went national and assumed current name in 1886.  It claims to be the oldest women's hereditary organization in the United States.
 American Association of University Women, founded as "Association of  Collegiate Alumnae" in 1882
Women's Health Protective Association, founded as the "Ladies' Health Protective Association" in 1884 in New York City, had 40 clubs from various cities at its 1897 convention in Philadelphia.
General Federation of Women's Clubs (GFWC), founded in 1890, federation of more than 3,000 women's clubs.  *National Association of Colored Women's Clubs (NACWC), founded 1896 from merger of 1895-founded National Federation of Afro-American Women, the c.1892-94 Women's Era Club of Boston, and the National League of Colored Women (founded when?) of Washington, D.C.
Colonial Dames of America (CDA), founded 1890, just before DAR and NSCDA
Daughters of the American Revolution (DAR), organized in 1890 after the Sons of the American Revolution would not admit women and expand to become "Sons and Daughters".  Promotes historic preservation, education, and patriotism.  Membership limited to direct lineal descendants of soldiers or others of the American Revolution.  Eclipsed the "Sons" in membership? with 195,000 members?
National Society of the Colonial Dames of America (NSCDA), founded 1891, distinct from CDA formed just prior
National Society United States Daughters of 1812, founded in 1892 as "United States Daughters of 1812"
National Plant, Flower and Fruit Guild, founded by 1895 (was this a women's organization?)
Northeastern Federation of Colored Women's Clubs, founded 1896, first umbrella organization for black women's clubs in the United States, went back and forth in affiliating with NACWC, had 55 clubs in northeastern U.S. in early 1900s, was incorporated in 1927
Phillis Wheatley Club, African Americans' women's clubs, started in 1895 in Nashville, TN, also in Florida, Illinois, Louisiana, New York, Ohio, Texas, Wisconsin and elsewhere
MacDowell Clubs, first founded in 1896 in Boston, about 400 in number, mostly choosing to be female only
Association of Southern Women for the Prevention of Lynching, founded in 1930 in Atlanta, Georgia, grew throughout the south to have a claimed presence in nearly every county throughout the south. Fought against lynchings of black persons.  Was restricted to white women only to better be able to affect white women opinions generally, and to address purported motivation of lynching to "protect" white women.
National Federation of Business and Professional Women's Clubs, founded in 1919, at a meeting led by Lena Madesin Phillips of Kentucky. In the 1930s it became a charter member of the International Federation of Business and Professional Women.
Yesharah Society, founded 1928, a social organization of female returned missionaries of the Church of Jesus Christ of Latter-day Saints.  Had multiple chapters, peaked in 1950s (perhaps most numerous within Utah?)
Navy Wives Clubs of America, founded 1936 in California
Executive Women's Golf Association, founded in 1991, headquartered in Palm Beach Gardens, Florida; in 2014 had 114 chapters throughout the United States, and 1 chapter each in Canada, Bermuda, South Africa, Ireland and Italy.
Pulpwood Queens, founded in 2000 in Jefferson, Texas; reportedly has 400 chapters, including 10 in foreign countries and one in a women's prison
United Daughters of the Confederacy, founded in 1894 in Nashville, Tennessee
Ladies' Memorial Association, founded in 1865 in Winchester, Virginia
United Order of Tents, founded in Virginia, a secret society for African American churchwomen
Embroiderers' Guild of America, established in 1958 as a branch of 1906-founded Embroiderers' Guild headquartered in London, England, and split off later.  Is this a women's club?  Seems was not exclusively for women, but probably was effectively a women's club.
League of Women Voters
National Council of Jewish Women
American News Women's Club, established in 1932 as a newspaper club for female reporters. The club's records are held at the University of Maryland Archives.

Alabama
In 1922 the Alabama Federation of Women's Clubs had 219 clubs with about 6,000 members, not counting "Colored" / African-American women's clubs.

Clubs in the state have included:
Alabama's Colored Women's Club
Mobile Business Women's Club, whose 1912 building in Fairhope, Alabama was listed on the NRHP in 2018 as American Legion Post 199.

Alaska
In 1922 the Alaska Federation of Women's Clubs had 9 clubs with about 427 members.
Anchorage Woman's Club

Arizona
In 1922 the Arizona State Federation of Women's Clubs had 53 clubs with about 3,515 members. In 1932, the Arizona Republic listed 66 federated clubs throughout the state.

 Coolidge Woman's Club, Coolidge, AZ, NRHP-listed
 Mesa Woman's Club, Mesa, AZ, NRHP-listed 
 Tempe Woman's Club, Tempe, AZ, NRHP-listed
 Willcox Women's Club, Willcox, AZ, NRHP-listed
 Woman's Club, Safford, AZ, NRHP-listed

Arkansas
In 1922 the Arkansas Federation of Women's Clubs, organized in 1897, had 250 clubs with about 8,000 members.

Woman's Community Club Band Shell, Heber Springs, Arkansas, NRHP-listed
Woman's Progressive Club, Wynne, AR, NRHP-listed
The Aesthetic Club, a women's literary club formed on 16 January 1883 in Little Rock, founded by Mary Eliza Knapp and others

California
In 1922 the California State Federation of Women's Clubs, organized in 1900, had 531 clubs with about 55,624 members.

Clubs in the state have included:
California State Federation of Colored Women's Clubs
Ebell of Long Beach, founded 1896; Pearl Jane Pearson Brison was involved
Wilfandel Club, founded 1945, oldest African American women's club in Los Angeles
Hollywood Women's Press Club, Los Angeles, founded 1928, no longer extant
Girls Club (San Francisco)
Los Angeles Nurses' Club
Friday Morning Club, Los Angeles, founded 1891.  Its second clubhouse building, built in 1923, is NRHP-listed
Woman's Building (Los Angeles), a "feminist mecca" during 1973 to 1991, a non-profit arts and education center (is this fairly categorized as a women's club?)
Berkeley City Club
Berkeley Women's City Club, Berkeley, California, NRHP-listed
Beverly Hills Women's Club, Beverly Hills, CA, NRHP-listed
College Women's Club, Berkeley, CA, NRHP-listed
Francisca Club, private women's club in San Francisco
Maywood Woman's Club, 902 Marin St. Corning, CA (associated with Edward Gardner Lewis's scheme), NRHP-listed
Woman's Improvement Club Clubhouse, Corona, CA, NRHP-listed
La Jolla Woman's Club, La Jolla, CA, NRHP-listed
La Puente Valley Woman's Club, La Puente, CA, NRHP-listed
Philomathean Clubhouse, Stockton, CA, NRHP-listed
San Pedro Woman's Club, San Pedro, CA
Woman's Club of Lincoln, Lincoln, CA, NRHP-listed
Woman's Club of Lodi, Lodi, CA, NRHP-listed
Montebello Woman's Club, Montebello, CA, NRHP-listed
Women's Athletic Club of Alameda County, Oakland, CA, NRHP-listed, whose NRHP doc also gives info about:
Woman's Athletic Club of San Francisco (1914), 640 Sutter St.
Women's Club of San Francisco (1927), also on Sutter Street
Women's Athletic Club of Los Angeles (1924)
Women's City Club of Oakland (1927-1928), 1428 Alice Street
Berkeley Women's City Club (1929-1930), 2315 Durant Avenue
Women's Improvement Club of Hueneme, Port Hueneme, CA, NRHP-listed
Woman's Club of Redondo Beach, Redondo Beach, CA, NRHP-listed
Woman's Athletic Club of San Francisco, San Francisco, CA, NRHP-listed
Ebell Society, founded in 1876 in Oakland as the International Academy for the Advancement of Women. The club's purpose was the advancement of women in cultural, industrial and intellectual pursuits.
Ebell Club of Santa Paula, Santa Paula, CA, NRHP-listed
Ebell of Los Angeles, Los Angeles, CA, NRHP-listed
Sausalito Woman's Club, Sausalito, CA, NRHP-listed
California Federation of Business & Professional Women's Clubs
San Rafael Improvement Club, founded 1902, a civic improvement organization whose clubhouse is listed on the NRHP.  It may or may not have defined itself as a club for women, but photos show it was.

Colorado
In 1922 the Colorado Federation of Women's Clubs, organized in 1895, total membership was not reported, but 28 clubs were listed in Winslow's directory.
 Colorado Federation of Women's Clubs
T.M. Callahan House, Longmont, listed on the National Register

Connecticut
In 1922 the Connecticut Federation of Women's Clubs had 80 clubs with about 7,000 members.

Delaware
In 1922 the Delaware Federation of Women's Clubs had 38 clubs with more than 3,000 members.

Woman's Club of Newport, Newport, DE, NRHP-listed
Delaware Children's Theatre

Florida
See also List of Woman's Clubhouses in Florida on the National Register of Historic Places
In 1922 the Florida Federation of Women's Clubs, organized in 1895, had 180 clubs with about 10,500 members.

Babson Park Woman's Club, Babson Park, FL, NRHP-listed
Boynton Woman's Club, Boynton Beach, FL, NRHP-listed
Woman's Club of Chipley, Chipley, FL, NRHP-listed
Clermont Woman's Club, Clermont, FL, NRHP-listed
Coco Plum Woman's Club, Coral Gables, FL, NRHP-listed
Coral Gables Woman's Club, Coral Gables, FL, NRHP-listed
Dade City Woman's Club, Dade City, FL, NRHP-listed
Davie Woman's Club, Davie, FL, NRHP-listed
Lemon Bay Woman's Club, Englewood, FL, NRHP-listed
Woman's Club of Eustis, Eustis, FL, NRHP-listed
Everglades Women's Club, Everglades City, in 1965 took home in NRHP-listed Everglades Laundry
Woman's Club of Jacksonville, Jacksonville, FL, NRHP-listed
Hollywood Woman's Club, Hollywood, FL, NRHP-listed
Lake Butler Woman's Club, Lake Butler, FL, NRHP-listed
Lloyd Woman's Club, Lloyd, FL, NRHP-listed
Melrose Woman's Club, Melrose, FL, NRHP-listed
Miami Women's Club, Miami, FL, NRHP-listed
Women's Club of Coconut Grove, Miami, FL, NRHP-listed
Woman's Club of New Smyrna, New Smyrna Beach, FL, NRHP-listed
Ormond Beach Woman's Club, Ormond Beach, FL, NRHP-listed
Woman's Club of Palmetto, Palmetto, FL, NRHP-listed
Punta Gorda Woman's Club, Punta Gorda, FL, NRHP-listed
Quincy Woman's Club, Quincy, FL, NRHP-listed
Bee Ridge Woman's Club, Sarasota, FL, NRHP-listed
St. Petersburg Woman's Club, St. Petersburg, FL, NRHP-listed
Sarasota Woman's Club, Sarasota, FL, NRHP-listed
Woman's Club of Starke, Starke, FL, NRHP-listed
Woman's Club of Tallahassee, Tallahassee, FL, NRHP-listed
Terra Ceia Woman's Club, Terra Ceia, FL, NRHP-listed
Vero Beach Woman's Club, Vero Beach, FL, NRHP-listed, also known as "Terra Ceia Village Improvement Association Hall"
Woman's Club of Winter Haven, Winter Haven, FL, NRHP-listed
Woman's Club of Winter Park, Winter Park, FL, NRHP-listed

Georgia
In 1922 the Georgia State Federation of Women's Clubs, organized in 1896, had 350 clubs with about 33,000 members.

Atlanta Neighborhood Union
Atlanta Women's Club, Atlanta, GA, NRHP-listed
Dawson Woman's Clubhouse, Dawson, GA, NRHP-listed
Demorest Women's Club, Demorest, GA, NRHP-listed
Lyons Woman's Club House, Lyons, GA, NRHP-listed
Rockmart Woman's Club, Rockmart, GA, NRHP-listed
Tennille Woman's Clubhouse, Tennille, GA, NRHP-listed
Women's Political Council, Montgomery

Hawaii
Women's Campus Club, established in 1920, grew from 1908-founded "Women's Club of the College of Hawaii"
Hilo Woman’s Club (1921)
Zonta International (1951)
Soroptimist International of Kona (1971)

Idaho
In 1922 the Idaho Federation of Women's Clubs, organized in 1905, had 109 clubs with about 5,000 members.
Portia Club, in Payette, Idaho, was organized in 1895, joined Idaho Federation in 1904, built clubhouse 1927, NRHP-listed
American Women's League Chapter House (Peck, Idaho), 217 N. Main St. Peck, ID (associated with Edward Gardner Lewis's scheme), NRHP-listed

Illinois
In 1922 the Illinois Federation of Women's Clubs, organized in 1892, had 584 clubs with about 66,963 members, not including any African-American women's clubs.

Clubs in the state have included:
Alpha Suffrage Club, black female suffrage club founded in 1913, based in Chicago
Chicago and Northern District Association of Colored Women's Clubs
Chicago Woman's Club
Frederick Douglass Woman's Club, Chicago, founded in 1906, one of the first women's clubs in Chicago to promote suffrage, and one of few interracial women's clubs in Chicago.  Mostly middle-class.  Pressured the Chicago Political League, another local woman's club to extend their membership to African-American women.
Three Arts Club of Chicago
Woman's Athletic Club, Chicago, founded in 1898, the first athletic club for women in the United States.
Fortnightly of Chicago, founded 1876
Queen Isabella Association, organized in Chicago in 1889 with purpose to create a statue of Spanish queen Isabella in the 1893 World's Columbian Exposition, it expanded to chapters in New York, St. Louis, and Washington D.C. as well, attempting to become a national organization
The Woman's Building (Chicago) was organized also for the 1893 World's Columbian Exposition (not a club?)
Alton Chapter House (built 1909), 509 Beacon St. Alton, IL (associated with Edward Gardner Lewis's scheme), NRHP-listed
Andover Chapter House, Locust St., NW Andover, IL (associated with Edward Gardner Lewis's scheme), NRHP-listed
Annawan Chapter House, 206 S. Depot St. Annawan, IL (associated with Edward Gardner Lewis's scheme), NRHP-listed
Carlinville Chapter House, 111 S. Charles St. Carlinville, IL (associated with Edward Gardner Lewis's scheme), NRHP-listed
Edwardsville Chapter House, 515 W. High St. Edwardsville, IL (associated with Edward Gardner Lewis's scheme), NRHP-listed
Woman's Club of Evanston, Evanston, IL, NRHP-listed
Marine Chapter House, Silver St. Marine, IL (associated with Edward Gardner Lewis's scheme), NRHP-listed
Princeton Chapter House, 1007 N. Main St. Princeton, IL (associated with Edward Gardner Lewis's scheme), NRHP-listed
Zion Chapter House, 2715 Emmaus Ave. Zion, IL (associated with Edward Gardner Lewis's scheme), NRHP-listed

Indiana
In 1922 the  Federation of Women's Clubs, organized in 1890-1900, had 517 clubs with about 23,269 members, not including any African-American women's clubs.

Indiana State Federation of Colored Women's Clubs, Indianapolis, NRHP-listed
The Propylaeum (John W. Schmidt House), Indianapolis, NRHP-listed
Woman's Improvement Club (Indianapolis), Indianapolis, Indiana
Vincennes Fortnightly Club, Vincennes, Indiana, NRHP-listed

Iowa
In 1922 the Iowa Federation of Women's Clubs, organized in 1893, had 806 clubs with about 40,485 members, not including any African-American women's clubs.

Iowa Federation of Colored Women's Clubs
Des Moines Women's Club, founded in 1885, Hoyt Sherman Place NRHP listed

Kansas
In 1922 the Kansas Federation of Women's Clubs, organized in 1895-1904, had 397 clubs with about 10,034 members, not including any African-American women's clubs.

Clubs in the state have included:
Woman's Club House, 900 Poyntz Ave., Manhattan, Kansas (associated with Edward Gardner Lewis's scheme), NRHP-listed
Topeka Council of Colored Women's Clubs Building, Topeka, KS, NRHP-listed
Woman's Club Building, Topeka, KS, NRHP-listed

Kentucky
In 1922 the Kentucky State Federation of Women's Clubs, organized in 1894, had 154 clubs with about 10,000 members, not including any African-American women's clubs.

Clubs in the state have included:
Kentucky Federation of Women's Clubs, founded 1894, affiliated with GFWC
Hodgenville Women's Club, Hodgenville, Kentucky, organized in 1919;  its 1934 building is NRHP-listed
Business Women's Club, Louisville, Kentucky, NRHP-listed

Louisiana
The Louisiana Federation of Women's Clubs was organized in 1899.  The 1922 directory listed 25 clubs, not including any African-American women's clubs.

Clubs in the state have included:
Era Club of New Orleans, founded 1896
Krewe of Muses, New Orleans, founded in 2000
Tallulah Book Club Building, Tallulah, Louisiana, NRHP-listed

Maine
In 1922 the Maine Federation of Women's Clubs had 147 clubs with about 6,500 members.

Maryland
In 1922 the Maryland Federation of Women's Clubs, organized in 1900, had 84 clubs with about 12,000 members, not including any African-American women's clubs.

Clubs in the state have included:
Woman's Literary Club of Baltimore

Massachusetts
In 1922 the Massachusetts Federation of Women's Clubs had 324 clubs with about 126,128 members.

Ladies Physiological Institute, Boston, asserted to be first women's club in U.S. (needs qualification), founded in 1848
Colored Female Religious and Moral Society, Salem, MA, organized in 1818
New England Women's Club, Boston, founded 1868, nearly tied with Sorosis in NYC as first professional(?) women's club in the U.S.
Saturday Morning Club, Boston, founded in 1871 by Julia Ward Howe
New England Woman's Press Association, Boston, founded 1885
Woman's Era Club, Boston, founded c.1892-94, first black women's club in Boston, attempted to desegregate GFWC in 1900.
Saturday Evening Girls club (1899-1969), Boston, operated The Paul Revere Pottery
Woman's Club of Fall River, Fall River, Massachusetts, NRHP-listed
Women's City Club of Boston
The College Club of Boston
Chilton Club, Back Bay area of Boston, founded in 1910

Michigan
In 1922 the Michigan State Federation of Women's Clubs, organized in 1895, had 423 clubs with about 50,567 members, not including any African-American women's clubs.

Women's City Club, Detroit, Michigan, NRHP-listed
Lansing Woman's Club Building, Lansing, Michigan, NRHP-listed
Ladies' Library Association of Kalamazoo
Detroit Women's City Club
Detroit Study Club, founded 1896, black women's literary organization also involved in social issues and community welfare

Minnesota
In 1922 the Minnesota State Federation of Women's Clubs, organized in 1895, had 601 clubs with about 48,153 members, not including any African-American women's clubs.

Saint Paul Women's City Club, St. Paul, Minnesota, NRHP-listed

Mississippi
In 1922 the Mississippi State Federation of Women's Clubs, organized in 1898, had 147 clubs with about 5,000 members, not including any African-American women's clubs.

Mississippi Federation of Women's Clubs, Jackson, Mississippi, NRHP-listed
Mississippi State Federation of Colored Women’s Clubs

Missouri
In 1922 the Missouri Federation of Women's Clubs, organized in 1896, had 306 clubs with about 20,000 members, not including any African-American women's clubs.

Montana
In 1922 the Montana Federation of Women's Clubs, organized in 1904, had 103 clubs with about 5,000 members, not including any African-American women's clubs.

Clubs in Montana have included:
Deer Lodge American Women's League Chapter House, 802 Missouri Ave. Deer Lodge, Montana (associated with Edward Gardner Lewis's scheme), NRHP-listed
Thompson Falls Women's Club, Thompson Falls, Montana, founded 1914, NRHP-listed

Nebraska
In 1922 the Nebraska Federation of Women's Clubs, organized in 1895, had 275 clubs with about 14,000 members, not including any African-American women's clubs.

Nevada
In 1922 the Nevada State Federation of Women's Clubs, organized in 1908, had 32 clubs with about 10,000 members, not including any African-American women's clubs.

Clubs in Nevada have included:
20th Century Club (Reno, Nevada), club organized in 1894; building built in 1925, NRHP-listed

New Hampshire
In 1922 the New Hampshire Federation of Women's Clubs had 126 clubs with about 11,730 members.

New Jersey
In 1922 the New Jersey State Federation of Women's Clubs had 232 clubs with about 35,000 members.

New Jersey State Federation of Women's Clubs
See also NJ clubhouses MRA/MPS doc.

New Mexico
In 1922 the New Mexico Federation of Women's Clubs, organized in 1911, had 50 clubs with about 2,000 members, not including any African-American women's clubs.

Clubs in New Mexico have included:
Alamogordo Woman's Club, Alamogordo, NM, NRHP-listed
Carrizozo Woman's Club, Carrizozo, NM, NRHP-listed
Silver City Woman's Club, Silver City, NM, NRHP-listed
Woman's Improvement Association of Las Cruces, founded in 1894

New York
In 1922 the New York State Federation of Women's Clubs, organized in 1894, had about 500 clubs with about 300,000 members.

Empire State Federation of Women's Clubs
Sorosis, NYC, founded 1868, first professional women's club in U.S.
Colony Club, New York City, founded 1903; its former building, the Old Colony Club, is NRHP-listed
Women's National Republican Club, NYC, founded in 1921; its 1934 building is NRHP-listed
Equal Suffrage League (Brooklyn)
Brooklyn Women's Club, founded in 1869
Mount Vernon Hotel Museum, headquarters of Colonial Dames of America which purchased it in 1924
Hroswitha Club (1944-1999) a club of women bibliophiles, all excluded (until 1976) from the men's Grolier Club and the Caxton Club.)  It met first at the Cosmopolitan Club (New York City) (a women's club) and met four to five times a year at multiple locations. Membership was capped at 40 members by the 1950s; members included Ruth S. Granniss, who was librarian to the Grolier Club.
Belizean Grove, NYC, founded 1999
Bronxville Women's Club, Bronxville, NY, NRHP-listed
Scarsdale Woman's Club, Scarsdale, NY, NRHP-listed
Women's Community Club of South Valley, South Valley, NY, NRHP-listed
Women's City Club of New York (WCC)
Woman's Press Club of New York City
Cosmopolitan Club (New York City)
Manor Club, Pelham Manor
New Century Club (Utica, New York), NRHP-listed

North Carolina
In 1922 the North Carolina State Federation of Women's Clubs, organized in 1902, had 196 clubs with about 10,000 members, not including any African-American women's clubs.

Clubs in North Carolina have included"
Charlotte Woman's Club, asserted to be the oldest civic organization in Charlotte, North Carolina. It established the first kindergarten in the city, staffed city buses and the Southern Railway station with volunteers during both World Wars. They were also involved with organizing the YWCA, PTA and Traveler's Aid in Charlotte. They also brought the first public health nurses to Charlotte and helped create the League of Women Voters. The CWC also supported the creation of the Mint Museum of Art and the Domestic Relations Court.
Fayetteville Women's Club and Oval Ballroom, Fayetteville, NC, NRHP-listed
Woman's Club of Fayetteville, Fayetteville, NC, founded in 1906 as a Civic Improvement Association to fight for preservation of historic Market House, not named a Women's Club until 1920. Established first public library in Fayetteville, continues to work for historic preservation.
Fuquay-Varina Woman's Club Clubhouse, Fuquay-Varina, NC, NRHP-listed

North Dakota
In 1922 the North Dakota Federation of Women's Clubs, organized in 1897, had 188 clubs with about 4,500 members, not including any African-American women's clubs.

Ohio
In 1922 the Ohio State Federation of Women's Clubs, organized in 1894, had 603 clubs with about 85,000 members, not including any African-American women's clubs.

Ohio clubs have included:
Dayton Women's Club (1916), Dayton, OH, NRHP-listed
Mansfield Woman's Club, Mansfield, OH, NRHP-listed
Cincinnati Federation of Colored Women's Clubs, owns, since 1925, the NRHP-listed C. H. Burroughs House

Oklahoma
In 1922 the Oklahoma State Federation of Women's Clubs, organized in 1898, had 225 clubs with about 10,000 members, not including any African-American women's clubs.

Federation of Women's Clubs for Oklahoma and Indian Territories
Oklahoma Federation of Colored Women's Clubs

Oregon
In 1922 the Oregon State Federation of Women's Clubs, organized in 1889, had 119 clubs with about 8,000 members, not including any African-American women's clubs.

Oregon clubs have included:
Dundee Woman's Club Hall, Dundee, OR, NRHP-listed
The Town Club, Portland, OR, NRHP-listed
Town Club (Portland, Oregon), same or different?

Pennsylvania
In 1922 the Pennsylvania State Federation of Women's Clubs, organized in 1895, had 233 clubs with about 57,180 members, not including any African-American women's clubs.

Pennsylvania clubs have included:
Woman's Club of Warren, Warren, PA, NRHP-listed
Saturday Club (Wayne, Pennsylvania)
Cosmopolitan Club of Philadelphia
The Plastic Club, Philadelphia, founded 1897
Charlotte Cushman Club and Library, Philadelphia, established in 1907, closed in 1999.

Rhode Island
In 1922 the Rhode Island Federation of Women's Clubs had 42 clubs with about 2,220 members.

South Carolina
In 1922 the South Carolina State Federation of Women's Clubs, organized in 1898, had 182 clubs with about 6,509 members, not including any African-American women's clubs.

South Carolina clubs have included:
South Carolina Federation of Colored Women's Clubs (SCRCWC)
General Federation of Women’s Clubs of South Carolina

South Dakota
In 1922 the South Dakota State Federation of Women's Clubs, organized in 1900, had 132 clubs with about 4,181  members, not including any African-American women's clubs.

Tennessee
In 1922 the Tennessee Federation of Women's Clubs, organized in 1899, had 120 clubs with about 8,000 members, not including any African-American women's clubs.

Tennessee clubs included:
Country Woman's Club, Clarksville, TN, NRHP-listed
Ossoli Circle, Knoxville, founded in 1885 as a literary society;  the Ossoli Circle Clubhouse]] (1933) is NRHP-listed
The Nineteenth Century Club, Memphis
Ladies Rest Room, Lewisburg, NRHP-listed.  Built by the Marshall County court in 1924 as a place for rural women to relax, rest, and eat during their visits to Lewisburg, the county seat. During the 1910s and 1920s, there was widespread encouragement in the United States for the establishment of ladies' lounges and rest rooms to accommodate rural women.

Texas
In 1922 the Texas Federation of Women's Clubs, organized in 1897, had 450 clubs with about 25,000 members, not including any African-American women's clubs.

Texas clubs have included:
The Woman's Club of Fort Worth
Woman's Club of San Antonio
Texas Equal Rights Association
Texas Equal Suffrage Association
Lyceum Club (Dallas)
 Texas Federation of Women's Clubs, created 70 percent of public libraries in Texas
 Texas Association of Women's Clubs, African American women, founded in 1905 to serve African Americans who were excluded from Texas Federation of Women's Clubs
 Women's Club of El Paso, El Paso.  Originated in 1894, achieved building in 1916, NRHP-listed
Woman's Club of El Paso is same or different?
Port Arthur Federated Women's Clubhouse, Port Arthur, TX, NRHP-listed
Texas Federation of Women's Clubs Headquarters, Austin, TX, NRHP-listed
Woman's Club of Beaumont Clubhouse, Beaumont, TX, NRHP-listed
Houston Heights Woman's Club, Houston, TX, NRHP-listed
The Euterpean Club, Fort Worth, founded 1896

See also: Pulpwood Queens, founded in Texas, with multiple locations elsewhere in U.S. and internationally.

Utah
In 1922 the Utah Federation of Women's Clubs, organized in 1893, had 72 clubs with about 3,500 members, not including any African-American women's clubs.

Utah clubs have included:
Ladies Literary Club Clubhouse, Salt Lake City, Utah, NRHP-listed

Vermont
In 1922 the Vermont Federation of Women's Clubs had 67 clubs with about 6,383 members.

Virginia
In 1922 the Virginia State Federation of Women's Clubs, organized in 1907, had 80 clubs with about 1,600 members, not including any African-American women's clubs.

Gloucester Women's Club, Gloucester, VA, NRHP-listed
Middlesex County Woman's Club, Urbanna, VA, a colonial era county courthouse building that has been headquarters of the club since 1948, NRHP-listed
Woman's Civic Betterment Club, Roanoke, founded 1907, aimed to improve sanitation
Mount Vernon Ladies' Association, preserves the George Washington's estate in Mount Vernon, Virginia.  Founded in 1853 with South Carolina and wider association of Southern ladies.

Washington
In 1922 the  Federation of Women's Clubs, organized in 1896, had 241 clubs with about 27,000 members, not including any African-American women's clubs.

Kirkland Woman's Club, Kirkland, WA, NRHP-listed
Longview Women's Clubhouse, Longview, WA, NRHP-listed
Woman's Club of Olympia, Olympia, WA, NRHP-listed
Women's University Club of Seattle, Seattle, WA, NRHP-listed
Woman's Club of Olympia, Olympia, Washington

Washington, D.C.
In 1922 the District of Columbia Federation of Women's Clubs, organized in 1894, had 30 clubs with about 8,000 members.

General Federation of Women's Clubs Headquarters, Washington, D.C., built 1875, has served as headquarters of the GWFC since 1922, NRHP-listed.
United States Daughters of 1812, National Headquarters, Washington, D.C., purchased in 1928 by the United States Daughters of 1812, is NRHP-listed.
Dumbarton House, headquarters of National Society of the Colonial Dames of America, was purchased iby the NSCDA in 1928, and is NRHP-listed.
Whittemore House, Washington, D.C., clubhouse of the Woman's National Democratic Club, NRHP-listed.
Women's City Club of Washington, D.C.
Sulgrave Club, Washington, D.C., NRHP-listed.

West Virginia
In 1922 the West Virginia State Federation of Women's Clubs, organized in 1904, had 78 clubs with about 5,000 members, not including any African-American women's clubs.

West Virginia clubs have included:
Parkersburg Women's Club, Parkersburg, NRHP-listed
Woman's Club of Fairmont, Fairmont, clubhouse in historic Thomas and Annie Fleming mansion, NRHP-listed

Wisconsin
In 1922 the  Federation of Women's Clubs, organized in 1896, had 312 clubs with about 20,000 members, not including any African-American women's clubs.

Wisconsin clubs have included:
Woman's Club of Wisconsin, Milwaukee, WI, NRHP-listed
Wauwatosa Woman's Club, Wauwatosa, WI, NRHP-listed

Wyoming
In 1922 the Wyoming Federation of Women's Clubs, organized in 1904, had 62 clubs with about 2,000 members, not including any African-American women's clubs.
Casper Women's Club House, Casper, NRHP-listed

U.S. Territories

Guam
Guam Women’s Club (founded 1952), asserted to be the first women’s organization on Guam.
International Women's Club of Guam (founded 1973)

Puerto Rico
See National Conference of Puerto Rican Women (founded in 1972 in Washington, D.C.)

See also
:Category:Clubwomen
List of YWCA buildings
List of Woman's Clubhouses in Florida on the U.S. National Register of Historic Places
List of traditional gentlemen's clubs in the United States
Woman's club movement
List of women's association football clubs
Home Demonstration Clubs

References

External links
Official Register and Directory of Women's Clubs in America, 1922 (Vol XXIV, the 24th annual edition), published by Helen M. Winslow

 

.
Women's club buildings
Clubs